Yamaneta is a small genus of east Asian spurred orb-weavers. It was first described by C. C. Feng, J. A. Miller and Y. C. Lin in 2019, and it has only been found in China.  it contains only two species: Y. kehen and Y. paquini. The type species, Yamaneta paquini, was originally described under the name "Maymena paquini".

See also
 Maymena
 List of Mysmenidae species

References

Mysmenidae genera
Spiders of China